The Baxter Community School District, or Baxter Community School, is a rural public school district serving the town of Baxter and surrounding areas in northern Jasper County, and a small area of southern Marshall County.

The school, which serves all grade levels PreK-12 in one building, is located at 202 E State Street in Baxter.

The school's mascot is the Bolts. Their colors are purple, silver and black.

History
In 1910, the Baxter school district had 15 teachers and an enrollment of 140.

Schools
Baxter Elementary School
Baxter High School

Baxter High School

Athletics
The Bolts compete in the Iowa Star Conference, including the following sports:
The Baxter mascot was previously the Bulldogs, but changed in 2016–17.

Cross Country (boys and girls)
Volleyball 
Football 
Basketball (boys and girls)
Wrestling 
Track and Field (boys and girls)
Golf (boys and girls)
Soccer (boys and girls)
Baseball 
Softball

See also
List of school districts in Iowa
List of high schools in Iowa

References

External links
 Baxter Community School District

Education in Jasper County, Iowa
Education in Marshall County, Iowa
School districts in Iowa